Karen Salmansohn is a self-help book author and designer with approximately two million books sold nationally and internationally. She is the founder of notsalmon.com, a personal development site, which offers books and video courses on topics including anxiety, toxic people, emotional eating, relationships, meditation, and happiness. Her website also includes many of her viral quote posters that she writes and designs.

Salmansohn was formerly a senior VP ad creative director (at age 26) who left her job to pursue writing. She has been profiled in the NY Times, Business Week, Chicago Tribune, LA Times, Philadelphia Inquirer, Time Magazine, ELLE, Marie Claire, and Fast Company. She also appeared in television shows and was a regular lifestyle reporter for Fox TV.

From 2005-2008 Salmansohn offered monthly seminars at THE SOHO HOUSE in New York City where she lives. In 2007-2008, she had her own SIRIUS radio show called Be Happy Dammit, inspired by the title of her best-selling book. She gave a Tedx Talk titled "Fun is a High Performance Fuel."  She also gives seminars nationally (at places like NAWBO, Gen Art, and Media Bistro) and internationally (in Canada, Germany, and elsewhere).

She is a regular columnist for Oprah, CNN, Psychology Today, Huffington Post, and MSN. She also wrote a career column for amNY, one of New York's largest newspapers, called "The 1 Minute Career Therapist". She is a relationship expert for msn.com, match.com and Lifetime TV and had previously been a career coach for AOL (alongside Tom Peters and Brian Tracey). She has nearly 40 books, five TV development deals, two film deals, and one perfume named "Unavailable: it's more than a perfume, it's a philosophy."

She is most known for her self-help books — like the titles How To Be Happy, Dammit, Think Happy, Life is Long, Prince Harming Syndrome, Instant Happy, Friends Forever, and The Bounce Back Book.  On her website, she describes her books as being for "people who would never be caught dead reading self-help books" or "self-help books you can give as a gift and not get slapped because they look kinda cool".

Her most recent book, Instant Calm, offers two-minute sensory meditations and was released in August 2019.

References

Selected works
 Karen Salmansohn as Oprah columnist (The difference between “bad compromise” and “good compromise”)
 Karen Salmansohn as Psychology Today columnist (Communication Tools To Help Kids Talk About Their Feelings)
 Karen Salmansohn as Huffington Post columnist (What Do You Tell Kids When They Ask Why Mean People Are Mean? (And what do you tell yourself too?))
 Karen Salmansohn as CNN columnist  (Don't be a jerk during your next fight)
 Karen Salmansohn as Match.com columnist  (How to be lucky in love)

External links
Official site of Karen Salmansohn

Living people
American self-help writers
Year of birth missing (living people)